During the 1993–94 English football season, Brentford competed in the Football League Second Division. In a season of transition, a failure to win any of the final 16 league matches ended all hopes of a finish in the play-off places.

Season summary
The 1993–94 season saw Brentford back in the Second Division after suffering relegation from the First Division at the first attempt. Former Chelsea manager David Webb replaced Phil Holder and immediately set about overhauling the squad, releasing 11 players and cancelling the contracts of Murray Jones, Neil Smilie and Detzi Kruszyński. 1992–93 top-scorer Gary Blissett left the club for a £350,000 fee settled by a tribunal, goalkeeper Graham Benstead and defender Terry Evans rejected new contracts and were made available for loan, while forward Joe Allon was transfer-listed. In came midfielder Paul Smith, forward Denny Mundee and youngster Scott Morgan from Bournemouth and non-League players Dean A. Williams and Dean P. Williams. Professional contracts were given to youth products Carl Hutchings, Craig Ravenscroft and Tamer Fernandes. Manager David Webb continued to strengthen the squad during the early months of the season, bringing in goalkeeper Kevin Dearden, defenders Martin Grainger and Gus Hurdle, midfielder Lee Harvey and forwards Ian Benjamin and Matthew Metcalf, with Terry Evans and Grant Chalmers leaving the club.

Brentford began the season with two wins from the first three matches to rise as high as 5th, before losing five of the next six to drop into the relegation places. Transfer-listed forward Joe Allon provided the catalyst for a revival, returning from a loan spell with Southend United to score 9 goals in eight games in all competitions and fire the Bees back up to 12th position by early November. His run was ended by a broken jaw suffered at the hands of teammate Mickey Bennett, who was immediately sacked by the club. Forward Denny Mundee stepped into the breach and scored 9 goals in as many games in all competitions to help elevate Brentford back into the play-off positions and the Football League Trophy quarter-finals. The run prompted Premier League club Southampton to offer David Webb their vacant manager's job, which Webb turned down. Two club records were set during the run – 11 consecutive away matches unbeaten in all competitions and 10 consecutive away league matches undefeated.

Brentford had risen to 5th in the table after a 4–1 win over Bristol Rovers on 12 February 1994, but a winless run of 16 matches to close out the season dropped the Bees to 16th. Webb had continued his rebuilding of the squad through the second half of the season, selling transfer-listed players Marcus Gayle, Joe Allon and Keith Millen, while bringing in defenders David Thompson and Barry Ashby, winger Darren Annon and forward Robert Taylor. Season-ending injuries to Taylor, Shane Westley, Ian Benjamin and suspensions incurred by Martin Grainger, David Thompson, Kevin Dearden and Brian Statham further hindered Webb's ability to pick a settled team.

League table

Results
Brentford's goal tally listed first.

Legend

Pre-season and friendlies

Football League Second Division

FA Cup

League Cup

Football League Trophy

 Source: Statto, 11v11, The Big Brentford Book Of The Nineties

Playing squad 
Players' ages are as of the opening day of the 1993–94 season.

 Source: The Big Brentford Book Of The Nineties

Coaching staff

Statistics

Appearances and goals
Substitute appearances in brackets.

Players listed in italics left the club mid-season.
Source: The Big Brentford Book Of The Nineties

Goalscorers 

Players listed in italics left the club mid-season.
Source: The Big Brentford Book Of The Nineties

Management

Summary

Transfers & loans

Kit

|
|
|
|

Awards 
 Supporters' Player of the Year: Kevin Dearden

References

Brentford F.C. seasons
Brentford